The Order for Merits to Lithuania is an award, presented by the President of Lithuania, which may be conferred on the citizens of Lithuania and foreign nationals for distinguished services promoting name of Lithuania, expanding a develop international relationships, for distinguished merits in social, culture, science, business, sport, military and in other areas. The award is presented in five classes, in ascending order, Knight, Officer, Commander, Grand Commander, and Grand Cross.

Appearance
The insignia of all of the classes contains a five-pointed cross is made of gold and covered with white enamel varying in size depending on the grade of the award. An oxidized silver Vytis is centered on the Cross with rays between the edges. The reverse of the cross depicts the coats of arms of Vilnius, Kaunas, Klaipėda, Šiauliai, and Panevėžys. Inscribed in the center is "Pro Lituania" and 2002. The ribbon is red moiré, with yellow and green stripes at the edges. The cross is attached to the ribbon by a device which depicts the area for which the award was made.

Columns of Gediminas: Civil Service and International Relations
Three Oak Leaves: Humanitarian Aid
An Open Book: Culture and Education
Wings of Mercury: Business and Industry
Staff of Aesculapius: Health Care and Social Welfare
Crossed Swords: Military Affairs
Torch: Sports

The rank of Grand Cross was awarded to Olympics swimming gold medalist Rūta Meilutytė on 10 August 2012 by Lithuanian President Dalia Grybauskaitė for her achievement in sports.

Recipients of the medal are not inducted into the Order for Merits to Lithuania.

References

Merits to Lithuania
Orders of merit
Awards established in 2002